Damian Byrtek (born 7 March 1991) is a Polish professional footballer who plays as a centre-back for Chojniczanka Chojnice in the II liga.

Club career

Early career
Before joining Podbeskidzie, Byrtek spent time with Olimpia Piekary Slaskie.

Podbeskidzie
In February 2010, he signed five-year contract with senior team of Podbeskidzie Bielsko-Biała.

KSZO
The first of Byrtek's loans was to KSZO. He was set to make his debut against Sokół Sokółka, but the match was called off. Instead, he made his debut a week later, in a 0–0 draw with Resovia.

Brzesko
In February 2013, Byrtek was loaned out to Okocimski KS Brzesko. He made his league debut on 9 March 2013 in a 1–0 loss to Cracovia.

Raków Częstochowa
In July 2013, Byrtek was loaned out to Raków Częstochowa in the II liga.

Chrobry Głogów
In January 2015, Byrtek moved to I liga club Chrobry Głogów on a free transfer.

Wisła Płock
In January 2016, Byrtek moved to Wisła Płock. The club were promoted to the Ekstraklasa in his debut season, and his top-flight debut came on 8 August 2016, in a 2–2 draw with Ruch Chorzów. He was brought on for Tomislav Božić in the 85th minute.

Stomil Osztyn
On 16 September 2020, he signed with Stomil Olsztyn.

References

External links
 

1991 births
Polish footballers
Poland under-21 international footballers
Podbeskidzie Bielsko-Biała players
Raków Częstochowa players
Chrobry Głogów players
Wisła Płock players
KSZO Ostrowiec Świętokrzyski players
Okocimski KS Brzesko players
Piast Gliwice players
Miedź Legnica players
OKS Stomil Olsztyn players
Chojniczanka Chojnice players
Ekstraklasa players
I liga players
II liga players
Living people
Sportspeople from Bielsko-Biała
Association football defenders